BC School Sports is the governing body for high school athletics in the province of British Columbia, Canada. It was originally organized in 1965 as the British Columbia Federation of School Athletic Associations (BCFSAA) by a group of interested teachers and administrators.  A Constitution was adopted in 1966. Jim Stewart of Coquitlam was the first President. Stewart was elected to the BC School Sports Honour Roll in 1993. Operational support was
received from the provincial government (but Provincial support was withdrawn in 2009). During a special general meeting in October 2009, the membership voted to increase fees up to 75% to offset the cost of the provincial government's elimination of funding.

History 
The association opened an office on January 1970, with Executive Secretary Don Steen as the first employee. The name was changed to BC School Sports in 1980-81.

The following individuals have been Presidents of the Association:

1968-70 Jim Stewart (Coquitlam)
1970-71 Ed Carlin (White Rock)
1971-72 Dan Doyle (Coquitlam)
1972-73 Neal Henderson (Victoria)
1973-74 Court Brousson (Victoria)
1974-75 Jack Armour (Vancouver)
1975-76 David Lynn (Williams Lake)
1976-78 Ray Towers (Coquitlam)
1978-79 Bob Stebbings (Delta)
1979-80 Rick Mark (Victoria)
1980-81 Terry Cotton (Ladysmith)
1981-82 Barry Wright (Westbank)
1982-84 Bob Price (Chemainus)
1984-85 Keith Lanphear (Cassiar)
1985-86 Bob Jackson (Richmond)
1986-87 Marty Cross (Prince George)
1987-88 Bob Ferguson (Creston)
1988-90 Collin York (Surrey)
1990-91 Dave Derpak (Nakusp)
1991-92 Ken Bartel (Kelowna)
1992-93 Jill Philipchuk (Vancouver)
1993-95 Dave Bingham (Winfield)
1995-96 Bob Lindsay (Kelowna)
1996-99 Jo Ann Ward (Coquitlam)
1999-03 Jeanine Stannard (Victoria)
2003-05 Brian Lynch (West Vancouver)
2005-06 Philip Cizmic (Timberline Secondary School | Campbell River)
2006-12 Raj Puri (North Surrey Secondary School | Surrey)
2012-16 Deb Whitten (SJ Willis Education Centre | Victoria)
2016-   Mike Allina (Vancouver Technical Secondary School | Vancouver)

School
High school sport in Canada